The 2015 Icelandic Cup, also known as Borgunarbikar for sponsorship reasons, was the 56th edition of the Icelandic national football cup.

Calendar
Below are the dates for each round as given by the official schedule:

First round

|colspan="3" style="background-color:#97DEFF"|1 May 2015

|-
|colspan="3" style="background-color:#97DEFF"|2 May 2015

|-
|colspan="3" style="background-color:#97DEFF"|3 May 2015

|-
|colspan="3" style="background-color:#97DEFF"|6 May 2015

|-
|colspan="3" style="background-color:#97DEFF"|9 May 2015

|}

Second round

|colspan="3" style="background-color:#97DEFF"|18 May 2015

|-
|colspan="3" style="background-color:#97DEFF"|19 May 2015

|-
|colspan="3" style="background-color:#97DEFF"|20 May 2015

|}

Third round

|colspan="3" style="background-color:#97DEFF"|2 June 2015

|-
|colspan="3" style="background-color:#97DEFF"|3 June 2015

|-
|colspan="3" style="background-color:#97DEFF"|4 June 2015

|}

Fourth round

|colspan="3" style="background-color:#97DEFF"|18 June 2015

|}

Quarterfinals

|colspan="3" style="background-color:#97DEFF"|4 July 2015

|-
|colspan="3" style="background-color:#97DEFF"|5 July 2015

|-
|colspan="3" style="background-color:#97DEFF"|6 July 2015

|}

Semifinals

Final

External links

2015 in Icelandic football
2015 domestic association football cups
Icelandic Men's Football Cup